The String Sextet in D minor "Souvenir de Florence", Op. 70, is a string sextet scored for 2 violins, 2 violas, and 2 cellos composed in the summer of 1890 by Pyotr Ilyich Tchaikovsky. Tchaikovsky dedicated the work to the St. Petersburg Chamber Music Society in response to his becoming an Honorary Member. The work, in the traditional four-movement form, was titled "Souvenir de Florence" because the composer sketched one of the work's principal themes while visiting Florence, Italy, where he composed The Queen of Spades. The work was revised between December 1891 and January 1892, before being premiered in 1892. It is the only string sextet by the composer.

Structure

Analysis 
The first movement is in sonata form and, without introduction, presents a rather violent yet melodic first theme in D minor. The second theme, in the dominant major key of A major, is much calmer; it flows from the first theme almost effortlessly and then proceeds into the development and recapitulation, which concludes with a quick coda.

The slow movement, in D major, has a very innocent, romantic theme initially stated by the first violin with pizzicato accompaniment before being taken up by the cello.  Following interruption by an interlude for all of the instruments, the theme returns for a repeat of the first section.

The last two movements, with their distinctly Russian and folk-like melodies and rhythms, greatly contrast with the previous ones.

Arrangements
This work has also been arranged for string orchestra, including one by Yuli Turovsky.

Excerpts from the score were used in the 2005 ballet Anna Karenina, choreographed by Boris Eifman.

References

External links

 Tchaikovsky Research
Recording by The Chamber Music Society of Lincoln Center from the Isabella Stewart Gardner Museum in MP3 format

Chamber music by Pyotr Ilyich Tchaikovsky
Compositions for string sextet
1890 compositions
Compositions in D minor
Music dedicated to ensembles or performers